Artifact is an album by The Electric Prunes, self-released in 2001. It was their first studio album since 1969.

The album is said to be the "real third" album by the band since past efforts did not include material by the actual group. The sleeve notes state that it "was the album we never got to make." It is a return to most of the band's original 1960s line-up.

Track listing
 "Lost Dream" (James Lowe, Mark Tulin) – 5:02
 "7 and 7 Is" (Arthur Lee) – 3:15
 "Big Stick" (Lowe, Tulin) – 2:56
 "Last Night I Had A Dream" (Randy Newman) – 4:12
 "Bullet Thru the Backseat" (Lowe, Tulin) – 5:15
 "Phone Won't Ring" (Lowe, Tulin) – 4:53
 "All About Wires" (Lowe, Tulin) – 6:03
 "Devil's Candy" (Lowe, Tulin) – 2:47
 "Analog Life" (Harris, Smith) – 4:35
 "Mujo 22" – 8:09
 "Castaway" (Lowe, Tulin) – 6:14
 "Le Fire" – 3:17
 "Halloween Ending" – 1:03
 "Hard Time" (Lowe, Tulin) – 5:32
 "Slobodon" – 4:30

Personnel

Electric Prunes
 James Lowe – vocals, rhythm guitar, harmonica
 Ken Williams – lead guitar
 Mark Moulin – lead guitar
 Mark Tulin – bass
 Cameron Lowe – keyboards
 Joe Dooley – drums

Additional musicians
 Peter Lewis – guitar
 Michael "Quint" Weakley – drums
 Mike Vasquez – drums
 Jim Grippo – dotar

Technical
 James Lowe – producer, engineer
 Mark Tulin - associate producer
 Jeff Foss – mastering
 Laura Pezotti – design
 Randy Luczak – artwork
 Pamela Lowe – photography
 Electric Prunes – liner notes

References

The Electric Prunes albums
2002 albums
Heartbeat Records albums